Plasmodium mackerrasae is a parasite of the genus Plasmodium.

Like all Plasmodium species P. mackerrasae has both vertebrate and insect hosts. The vertebrate hosts for this parasite are reptiles.

Description 
The parasite was first described by Telford in 1979.

Geographical occurrence 
This parasite is found in Australia.

Clinical features and host pathology 
This species occurs naturally in the Australian skinks Egernia cunninghami and Egernia striolata.  It will also infect Egernia whitei.

References 

mackerrasae